Mimagoniates inequalis, known as the croaking tetra (a common name also applied to M. lateralis and  M. microlepis), is a species of tetra in the genus Mimagoniates.  It was previously classified as Glandulocauda inequalis

References

Tetras
Taxa named by Carl H. Eigenmann
Fish described in 1911